Kibaha is a city, with a population of 128,488 (2012 census), located in eastern Tanzania. It is the capital of Pwani Region. It is located in Kibaha District, one of the six districts of Pwani Region.

Education
Kibaha hosts the Kibaha Education Centre.

Transport

Road
Kibaha is served by the A7.

References

 Kibaha District Homepage for the 2002 Tanzania National Census

Populated places in Pwani Region
Regional capitals in Tanzania